Geoffrey Thomas Clarke (22 September 1903 – 17 October 1976) was an Australian politician who represented the South Australian House of Assembly seat of Burnside from 1946 to 1959 for the Liberal and Country League.

References

1903 births
1976 deaths
Members of the South Australian House of Assembly
Liberal and Country League politicians
20th-century Australian politicians